The 2023 Iga Świątek tennis season officially began on 31 December 2022 as the start of the 2023 WTA Tour. Iga Świątek entered the season as the world number 1 player in singles for the first time in her career.

All matches

Singles matches

Mixed doubles matches

Tournament schedule

Singles schedule

Mixed doubles schedule

Yearly records

Top 10 wins

Singles

Finals

Singles: 2 (1 title, 1 runner-up)

Earnings

Notes

References

External links

 
 
 

2023 in Polish tennis
2023 tennis player seasons
Iga Świątek tennis seasons